Kuschelysius is a genus of true weevils, belonging to the tribe Eugnomini, endemic to the South Island of New Zealand. Four species have been described.

References

Curculionidae
Curculionidae genera